Pictureland (1911) is a silent film starring Isabel Rea and King Baggot, released by Independent Moving Pictures (IMP), and possibly directed by Thomas H. Ince.

The film was made on location in Cuba.

Plot
Americans arrive at their hotel in Cuba in a car, to make a movie. Romantic complications ensue while the cast and crew attempt to finish the movie.

Cast
Isabel Rea as Rosita
King Baggot as Pablo

Preservation status
Previously thought to be a lost film, the film was rediscovered by a researcher, Robert Hoskin, in Australia who received a print from Japan.

See also
List of rediscovered films
Mary Pickford filmography

References

External links
 
Pictureland at SilentEra
Nitrateville entry (July 18, 2015)

1913 films
American silent short films
Films directed by Thomas H. Ince
American black-and-white films
1910s rediscovered films
American romance films
1910s romance films
Independent Moving Pictures films
Films produced by Carl Laemmle
Rediscovered American films
1910s American films